FDE may refer to:

 Federal Directorate of Education, an agency of the Pakistani government
 Førde Airport, Bringeland, in Norway
 Førde Airport, Øyrane, in Norway, closed in 1986
 FrameMaker Development Environment, part of Adobe FrameMaker
 Fetch, Decode, Execute in Computer Science.
 Full disk encryption
 First-degree entailment, a weakening of paraconsistent logic lacking truths
 Fault detection and exclusion, a technique used in global positioning systems
 Forensic document examination, a synonym of "questioned document examination"